Matthew Foschini (born 19 October 1990) is an Australian footballer who plays as a defender for Oakleigh Cannons.

Club career

Early career
Foschini began his football career at Glen Waverley Junior Soccer Club.

Melbourne Victory
On 18 August 2009, Foschini was signed to a contract with the Melbourne Victory senior squad on a two-year deal, becoming the first player to be signed straight from the Youth Academy. On 27 December 2009 he made his starting debut for Victory against North Queensland Fury in a 1–0 loss.

In 2012, Foschini signed another two-year contract deal with Melbourne Victory. He was given the number 2 jersey from Kevin Muscat.

Foschini was a part of Victory's 2010-2012 ACL campaigns, where played 11 games.

Foschini played a number of exhibition matches for Victory including LA Galaxy FC, Boca Juniors FC, Celtic FC, and Olympiakos FC .

On 8 August 2013, Foschini was released by the Victory.

Salgaocar
On 31 October 2013, Foschini signed for I-League club Salgaocar F.C.
He made his debut for Salgaocar in the I-League on 22 November 2013 against Pune F.C. at the Duler Stadium in which he played the whole match as Salgaocar drew the match 1–1. On 18 December 2014, he scored against Mumbai F.C. in the Group Stage of the 2013–14 Indian Federation Cup, Slagaocar would ultimately win 2–1.

Ottawa Fury FC
Foschini trained with Ottawa Fury FC from early pre-season through to mid May 2015. He trained with the team full-time and played several pre-season matches. Marc Dos Santos said Foschini would have been signed already if Fury wasn't carrying the maximum number of international players."I loved him ... he's definitely an NASL-level player," said Dos Santos. "We're going to keep a door open, a good contact and maybe he could be an option in 2016."

Oakleigh Cannons FC
In June 2015, Matthew joined Oakleigh Cannons FC. Foschini was an integral part of getting the team to the FFA Cup Finals.
Foschini was a versatile defender for Oakleigh and the big games was what he thrived on.
Oakleigh Cannons coach Arthur Papas wished he had another 10 Matt Foschini's at his disposal following the club's heartbreaking FFA Cup quarter-final exit against Hume City.

South Melbourne FC
In December 2015, South Melbourne FC signed Foschini. South experience a shortage of defenders in 2015, and Foschini could play a number of defensive positions including right back, centre-half or holding midfield.
South Melbourne won the NPL Victoria Championship, defeating Oakleigh Cannons.
Foschini was awarded with the club's Most Valuable Player and Media's Team Player Choice.

Personal life
Foschini was born in Melbourne, Victoria. He is the son of former Australian rules footballer Silvio Foschini. He attended Caulfield Grammar School, where he captained the First XI Team.

See also
 List of Caulfield Grammar School people

References

External links
 

1990 births
Living people
Australian people of Italian descent
Soccer players from Melbourne
Melbourne Victory FC players
Salgaocar FC players
Oakleigh Cannons FC players
People educated at Caulfield Grammar School
A-League Men players
I-League players
Expatriate footballers in India
Australia youth international soccer players
Association football defenders
Australian soccer players
Australian expatriate sportspeople in India
Australian expatriate soccer players